Carl Lawson (born June 29, 1995) is an American football defensive end for the New York Jets of the National Football League (NFL). He played college football at Auburn.

Early years
Lawson attended Milton High School in Milton, Georgia. He had 87 tackles and 15 sacks as a junior and 78 tackles and 27 sacks his senior year. Lawson was a consensus five-star recruit and was ranked among the top recruits in his class. He committed to Auburn University to play college football.

College career
As a true freshman at Auburn in 2013, Lawson had 20 tackles and four sacks. He missed his sophomore year in 2014 due to a torn ACL. In 2015, Lawson played in only seven games in his junior season due to injuries, recording 17 tackles and one sack.

Professional career

Cincinnati Bengals
Lawson was drafted by the Cincinnati Bengals in the fourth round, 116th overall, in the 2017 NFL Draft. He played in all 16 games with one start, recording 16 tackles and 8.5 sacks. His 8.5 sacks finished second on the team behind Geno Atkins' 9.0 and first among all rookies, earning him a spot on the PFWA All-Rookie Team.

In 2018, Lawson played in eight games before suffering a season-ending torn ACL in Week 8. He was placed on injured reserve on November 5, 2018.

New York Jets
On March 18, 2021, Lawson signed a three-year, $45 million contract with the New York Jets.

On August 19th, 2021, during a joint practice with the Green Bay Packers, Lawson went down with an apparent left leg injury.  An MRI later confirmed that Lawson had suffered a ruptured Achilles’ tendon in his left leg, ending his 2021 NFL season.

NFL career statistics

Regular season

References

External links

Auburn Tigers bio
Cincinnati Bengals bio

1995 births
Living people
People from Alpharetta, Georgia
Players of American football from Georgia (U.S. state)
Sportspeople from Fulton County, Georgia
American football defensive ends
Auburn Tigers football players
Cincinnati Bengals players
New York Jets players